Whitmore may refer to:

People
Whitmore (surname)

Places
In the United Kingdom
Whitmore, Staffordshire, England
Whitmore High School, Harrow

In the United States
Whitmore, California
Whitmore, Ohio
Whitmore Village, Hawaii
Whitmore Lake, Michigan

Elsewhere
Whitmore Mountains, Antarctica

Other
Whitmore (horse), American thoroughbred racehorse
Whitmore Stakes, American thoroughbred stakes race
Melioidosis, commonly known as Whitmore's Disease.